Watts Branch is a tributary stream of the Anacostia River in Prince George's County, Maryland, and Washington, D.C.

Course 
The headwaters of the stream originate in the Capitol Heights area of Prince George's County, and the branch flows roughly 

Water quality 
Watts Branch is in a highly urbanized area, and its water quality has been rated as poor by government agencies. The stream has been polluted by urban runoff (stormwater), dumped trash and leaking sewer pipes. Much of the stream is in concrete channels or culverts. A variety of stream cleanup and restoration projects have been initiated by D.C. government, the United States Environmental Protection Agency (EPA) and other federal agencies, in cooperation with community organizations such as the Anacostia Riverkeeper, the Anacostia Watershed Society, Groundwork Anacostia, and the Watts Branch Community Alliance.

See also
Watts Branch (Potomac River)
List of District of Columbia rivers
List of Maryland rivers

References

External links
 Anacostia Riverkeeper
 Anacostia Watershed Society
 Anacostia Watershed Network
 Watts Branch Park Photo Gallery Washington Parks & People - Community Park Partnership

Anacostia River
Rivers of Prince George's County, Maryland
Rivers of Washington, D.C.
Rivers of Maryland